Carlo Bomans (born 10 June 1963) is a Belgian former racing cyclist. He competed in the individual road race event at the 1984 Summer Olympics. In October 2005 he succeeded José De Cauwer as coach of the Belgian national cycling team. As coach of the Belgian national cycling team he won the world championship cycling in 2012 with Philippe Gilbert.

References

External links 

1963 births
Living people
Belgian male cyclists
People from Bree, Belgium
Olympic cyclists of Belgium
Cyclists at the 1984 Summer Olympics
Cyclists from Limburg (Belgium)
20th-century Belgian people